Leo Regan is an Irish filmmaker and author. Initially working as a photojournalist, Regan began his career with the book Public Enemies (1993). He later became involved in documentary filmmaking, and in 2001 won a BAFTA for his documentary 100% White.

Early life and career
Regan was born in 1963, and grew up in Dublin, Ireland.

He began his career as a photo journalist with the book Public Enemies, which explores the lives of British far right skinheads in the 1990s.

In 2001, Regan won the BAFTA Flaherty Documentary Award at the 54th British Academy Film Awards for his documentary 100% White. A 2002 review in Modern Times credited Regan's "single crew films" as going "back to observational basics – a good lesson in the current British climate of gimmicky constructed documentaries".

In 2005, he received an award from the Directors Guild of Great Britain for his TV drama Comfortably Numb.

Filmography
 A Very Dangerous Doctor (2011)
 The Doctor Who Hears Voices (2008)
 Scars (2006)
 Comfortably Numb (2004)
 Battlecentre (2001)
 Cold Turkey (2001)
 100 Per Cent White (2000)
  Don't Get High on Your Own Supply (1998)

Books 
Public Enemies (1993)
Taken Down In Evidence: Ireland From the Back of a Police Car (1995)

References 

Irish film directors
Irish film producers
Living people
1963 births